Christian Obrist (born 20 November 1980 in Brixen) is an Italian middle distance runner, who specializes in the 1500 m.

Biography
Obrist finished seventh in the 1500 m final at both the 2002 European Athletics Championships in Munich and the 2006 European Athletics Championships in Gothenburg. He was also a semi-finalist at the 2003 World Championships in Athletics.

His personal best time is 3:35.32 minutes, achieved in September 2007 in Rieti. He first represented the sports club SSV Brixen, than C.S. Carabinieri.

Achievements

National titles
Christian Obrist has won 12 times the individual national championship.
8 wins in the 1500 metres (2000, 2002, 2003, 2004, 2005, 2006, 2007, 2012)
4 wins in the 1500 metres indoor (2001, 2006, 2008, 2009)

See also
 Italian all-time top lists - 1500 metres

References

External links
 

1980 births
Living people
Sportspeople from Brixen
Italian male middle-distance runners
Athletes (track and field) at the 2008 Summer Olympics
Olympic athletes of Italy
World Athletics Championships athletes for Italy
Mediterranean Games bronze medalists for Italy
Athletes (track and field) at the 2005 Mediterranean Games
Mediterranean Games medalists in athletics
Athletics competitors of Centro Sportivo Carabinieri
Germanophone Italian people